Persipo stand for Persatuan Sepakbola Indonesia Poerwakarta (English: Football Association of Indonesia Purwakarta) is an Indonesian football club based in Purnawarman Stadium, Purwakarta, Purwakarta Regency, West Java. Club played at Liga 3.

References

External links 
 Liga-Indonesia.co.id
 

Purwakarta Regency
Football clubs in Indonesia
Football clubs in West Java
Association football clubs established in 1936
1936 establishments in the Dutch East Indies